Tai Wan Road is a road in Tai Wan, Kowloon, Hong Kong. It starts from Ma Tau Wai Road to Dyer Avenue.

Name and history
Since 2 June 1922, the official Chinese name was 大灣道, but it was mistaken as 大環道 on road signs and people got used to the wrong name even since. On 23 December 2005, the Hong Kong Government announced that the road will be split into two different roads and the new names will be Tai Wan Road and Tai Wan Road East. The change also reflects the splitting of the new road by Man Yue Street.

See also
 List of streets and roads in Hong Kong

References

Roads in Kowloon